Brockington is an unincorporated community in Saskatchewan.

Kinistino No. 459, Saskatchewan
Unincorporated communities in Saskatchewan
Division No. 15, Saskatchewan